Australopyrum is a genus of plants in the grass family, native to Australia, New Zealand, and New Guinea.

The genus Australopyrum is closely related to Agropyron, and some authors consider it part of that genus.

 Species
 Australopyrum calcis Connor & Edgar - New Zealand South Island 
 Australopyrum pectinatum (Labill.) Á.Löve - Queensland, New South Wales, Tasmania; naturalised in New Zealand  
 Australopyrum retrofractum (Vickery) Á.Löve - New South Wales, Tasmania; naturalised in New Zealand North Island 
 Australopyrum uncinatum Veldkamp - New Guinea 
 Australopyrum velutinum (Nees) B.K.Simon - New South Wales, Tasmania, Victoria

 formerly included
see Stenostachys 
 Australopyrum enysii - Stenostachys enysii

References

Pooideae
Poaceae genera